EG Andromedae (often abbreviated to EG And) is a symbiotic binary in the constellation Andromeda. Its apparent visual magnitude varies between 6.97 and 7.80.

System
The EG Andromedae system hosts a white dwarf and an evolved giant star, with an orbital period of 482 days and a half. The giant star is losing mass through its stellar wind at a rate higher than 10−6 /yr, and the white dwarf is accreting a fraction of this mass without forming an accretion disk. The white dwarf itself could emit a hot wind that interacts with the cooler one of the giant star, in addition to inducing the photoionization of the latter. X-ray observations, however, failed to detect emission coming from colliding winds, but established the non-magnetic nature of the white dwarf and estimated its accretion rate at 1-10 /yr.

The giant star doesn't fill its Roche lobe but there are still large uncertainties on its mass and radius. Even the parameters of the white dwarf are not strictly constrained, but available models can give lower and upper limits.

Spectrum
The optical spectral classification of EG Andromedae is M2IIIep, the one of a cool giant star with a peculiar spectrum and strong emission lines. The white dwarf contaminates the spectrum of the giant star photoionizes the stellar wind, giving rise to the spectral peculiarities. Emission lines H-alpha and H-beta, as well as TiO and CaI ones, change in phase with the orbit.

The white dwarf is best studied in the ultraviolet, where also highly ionized species sulfur, oxygen, nitrogen, carbon and phosphorus can be identified with their absorption or emission lines.

X-ray observation of EG Andromedae detected a hot plasma (at a temperature of 3 keV) that is likely situated in the outer boundary layer of the white dwarf, without any contribution from an accretion disk.

Variability
To date, no outburst has been observed in EG Andromedae. The observed variability is well described by the two components eclipsing each other during the orbit. However, there is some evidence that the giant star and the wind flow have an intrinsic variation.

References

004174
Andromeda (constellation)
Andromedae, EG
J00443718+4040456
003494
Durchmusterung objects
M-type giants
Z Andromedae variables
Emission-line stars